Star Inspector is a 1980 Soviet science fiction film directed by Mark Kovalyov and Vladimir Polin.

Plot
Unknown combat space ship, later identified as "Antares", the property of company "Meinthaus", commits an unmotivated attack on the base of the International Space Inspectorate and destroys it. The investigation of this event is entrusted to Sergei Lazarev, who, along with his comrades on the Vaigach patrol ship, arrives at the scene of the incident.

Star inspectors find that the causes of what happened should be sought in the mysterious disappearance a few years ago of a group of scientists led by the talented biologist Augusto Michelli.

On the instructions of the "Meinthaus" company, in the atmosphere of the deepest secrecy, work was completed on the working model of the artificial brain, which got out of control and enslaved its creators. Artificial intelligence is trying to get hold of the brains of the crew of the patrol ship, but they have the "Orlov effect", which can protect from kappa radiation for three hours ...

Cast
Vladimir Ivashov — Sergey Lazarev
Yury Gusev — Gleb Sklyarevsky
Timofei Spivak — Karel Zdeněk
Valentina Titova — Marjorie Hume
Emmanuil Vitorgan — Douglas Kober
Vilnis Bekeris — Steve Wilkins
Boris Kazin — commentator
Vyacheslav Gostinsky — lawyer
Khazral Shumakhov — Luis Revera
Alexander Rogovin — Chairman of the International Association
Leonid Kmit — reporter
Valery Lysenkov — reporter
Valentin Kulik — reporter
Nikolay Brilling — representative of the firm "Meinthouse"
Konstantin Zakharov — Assistant to the Chairman

References

External links

1980s science fiction films
Soviet science fiction films
Mosfilm films
Films about artificial intelligence